Gerhard "Gerd" Kostmann (born 2 July 1941) is a German former footballer who played as a striker. He is most remembered for being the top scorer for two consecutive seasons in the East German DDR-Oberliga before reunification.

Personal life

Notes

References

External links

 Career stats at RSSSF

1941 births
Living people
Sportspeople from Szczecin
German footballers
East German footballers
FC Hansa Rostock players
Association football forwards
DDR-Oberliga players